The new Stutz 8 was advertised as having its body "designed by Brewster & Company" in their 1925 catalogue, when they were actually engineered by Brewster instead.

8 cylinder